John Baptist Denny, Jr. (1851-1918) was the last hereditary grand chief of the Grand Council (Mi'kmaq), from 1881 to 1918.

Commemoration 
On 28 January 2019, Temma Frecker, a Nova Scotia teacher at The Booker School, was awarded the Governor General's History Award for her class' proposal to build a statue of Denny in Cornwallis Park.  Her proposal was to include the existing Edward Cornwallis statue among three other statues of Acadian Noël Doiron, Black Nova Scotian Viola Desmond and Mi'kmaq Chief John Denny Jr.  The four statutes would be positioned as if in a conversation with each other, discussing their accomplishments and struggles.

References 

History of Nova Scotia
1851 births
1918 deaths
Mi'kmaq people